Cymothoe cyclades is a butterfly in the family Nymphalidae. It is found in Cameroon and the eastern part of the Democratic Republic of the Congo.

References

Butterflies described in 1871
Cymothoe (butterfly)
Butterflies of Africa
Taxa named by Christopher Ward (entomologist)